Nevit Kodallı (12 December 1924, Mersin – 1 September 2009, Mersin) was a Turkish composer of western-influenced classical music including operas and ballets. In 1948 he travelled to Paris where he studied with Arthur Honegger and Nadia Boulanger. He returned in 1953 and from 1955 he taught at the Ankara State Conservatory.

His work includes oratorios and ballets from Turkish history as well as operas on the subjects of Gilgamesh and Vincent van Gogh.

References

External links
50 years of Turkish ballet by the theatre scholar Metin And
Obituary in English edition of Hürriyet
a note by Kodallı on the Mersin Festival (English)
portrait and worklist in Turkish

1924 births
2009 deaths
Turkish composers
Turkish opera composers
Ballet composers
People from Mersin
Burials at Mersin Cemetery
Male classical composers
20th-century male musicians